The Spanish–Italian Amphibious Battlegroup is one of 18 European Union battlegroups. 
It is formed by the Spanish–Italian Landing Force (SILF) of the Spanish–Italian Amphibious Force (SIAF). It consists of 1500 Marines with manpower contributed from the participating countries. From January until June 2009, it was on the EU Battlegroup standby roster.

Order of battle
The unit uses a modular organization.

SILF
The primary core of the unit is made up by:
 the Italian San Marco Marine Brigade.
 the Spanish Brigada de Infantería de Marina (BRIMAR of the Spanish Marines)

SIAF
It also has attached units from the Italian and Spanish Navies:

 Aircraft Carriers:
 Cavour
 LHA
 L-61 Juan Carlos I
 Giuseppe Garibaldi
 Landing Ships:
 L-51 Galicia
 L-52 Castilla
 L-9892 San Giorgio
 L-9893 San Marco
 L-9894 San Giusto

References

External links
Fuerza Anfibia Hispano Italiana (SIAF) (Spanish Defence Ministry)
Forza Anfibia Italo-Spagnola (SIAF) (Italian Defence Ministry)

Battlegroups of the European Union
Multinational units and formations
Italy–Spain military relations